is a railway freight terminal in Higashi Eki-chō, Minami-ku, Hiroshima, Japan, owned and operated by Japan Freight Railway Company (JR Freight).

Location
It is located adjacent to Hiroshima motive power depot.

The terminal has four loading and unloading tracks, and seven arrival and departure tracks.

References

Railway freight terminals in Japan
Stations of Japan Freight Railway Company
Railway stations in Hiroshima Prefecture
Sanyō Main Line
Geibi Line
Railway stations in Japan opened in 1969